Clyde Nelson (September 1, 1921 – July 26, 1949) was an American Negro league third baseman in the 1940s.

A native of Bradenton, Florida, Nelson made his Negro leagues debut in 1944 for the Chicago American Giants. He played three seasons for Chicago, and was selected to represent the club in the 1946 East–West All-Star Game. Nelson went on to spend two seasons with the Cleveland Buckeyes, and played for Cleveland in the 1947 Negro World Series. He played his final season with the Indianapolis Clowns in 1949. Nelson died in Philadelphia, Pennsylvania in 1949 at age 27 after suffering a heart attack following a doubleheader at Shibe Park against the Philadelphia Stars.

References

External links
 and Seamheads

1921 births
1949 deaths
Chicago American Giants players
Cleveland Buckeyes players
Indianapolis Clowns players
20th-century African-American sportspeople
Baseball infielders
Sports deaths in Pennsylvania